Chanoch Nissany (born 29 July 1963) is an Israeli-Hungarian auto racing driver now based in Budapest, Hungary. He is a businessman, and initially took up motor racing as a hobby. He is the first Israeli racing driver to compete in some of the higher levels of the international racing sports, such as International Formula 3000 and World Series Lights. Nissany is the first Israeli who participated at a Formula One Grand Prix weekend, on his birthday, 29 July 2005, in the first free practice session of the 2005 Hungarian Grand Prix, when he drove at the Hungaroring as one of the official test drivers of the Minardi F1 Team. He was 6.8 seconds slower than teammate Christijan Albers in free practice at the event. After spinning the car, he was unable to take the steering wheel out of his Minardi so he was recovered with the car.

His son, Roy Nissany, is also a racing driver.

Career
Nissany started racing in 2002, at the relatively late age of 38. He began his career in the 2002 Formula 2000 Hungarian National Championship, and was runner-up in his first season. In the following year, he won the same competition racing for Szasz Motorsport at the wheel of a Coloni CN-98. From 2003, he started to compete at more international events such as FIA Central European Zone and World Series Lights. 

In 2004, he defended his title in the Formula 2000 Hungarian National Championship. Furthermore, Nissany signed a contract with Coloni Motorsport for 2004 and he competed in Formula 3000. Since he has progressed at Coloni, Nissany completed four tests – two with Jordan Grand Prix and two with Minardi.

On 2 February 2005, Paul Stoddart, the owner of the Minardi Formula One racing team made an announcement at the Hilton Hotel in Tel-Aviv. At this international press conference, Stoddart announced that Nissany had become the official test driver for the team for the 2005 season.

On his 42nd birthday, Nissany drove in the first practice session for the Hungarian Grand Prix, although his fastest time was 12.9 seconds slower than the fastest driver in the field, McLaren test driver Alexander Wurz. His only Formula One session ended in a gravel trap after a spin. Despite this, he initially complained that the car had too much grip. Nissany reportedly forgot how to remove the steering wheel from his cockpit, and would remain seated in his beached car while marshals removed it with a crane. At subsequent Grands Prix, he was replaced by Enrico Toccacelo.

In 2005, since Nissany focused on his international obligations with Minardi, he had to miss a couple of crucial races at the Formula 2000 Hungarian National Championship which cost him the title by six points. One year later, he regained the title and in 2007, he defended his title at the Formula 2000 Hungarian National Championship. He won all of his titles as Formula 2000 Hungarian National champion, except his last one in 2009, with Laszlo Szasz's racing team.

Racing record

Formula 2000 Hungarian National Championship

Complete International Formula 3000 results
(key) (Races in bold indicate pole position; races in italics indicate fastest lap.)

Complete Formula One participations
(key)

See also
List of Israeli racing drivers
List of Jewish racing drivers

References

External links

Article about Nissany at Something Israeli
Jewish Racing Drivers Association

1963 births
Living people
Israeli Jews
Israeli racing drivers
International Formula 3000 drivers
People from Tel Aviv
Scuderia Coloni drivers